Ciprian Cornel Prodan (born 28 April 1979 in Satu Mare, Satu Mare County) is a Romanian former footballer who played as a striker. His older brother, Daniel, was also a professional footballer.

References

External links

1979 births
Living people
Sportspeople from Satu Mare
Romanian footballers
Association football forwards
Liga I players
Liga II players
FC Olimpia Satu Mare players
ASA 2013 Târgu Mureș players
FC Universitatea Cluj players
FC Politehnica Timișoara players
FC Brașov (1936) players
CS Gaz Metan Mediaș players
CS Brănești players
Ethnikos Asteras F.C. players
Romanian expatriate footballers
Expatriate footballers in Greece